The A2 highway (Riga - Sigulda - Border of Estonia (Veclaicene)), also known as the Vidzeme or Pskov highway is a national road in Latvia, which connects Riga to the Estonian border (Veclaicene). The highway continues in Estonia as highway 7, and then in Russia as A212 until Pskov. The highway is fully covered in asphalt and its length in Latvia is 196 km. Currently the A2 has 2x2 lanes from Riga until almost Sigulda, after that it turns to 1x1 lanes. From Riga bypass the highway is a part of European route E77.

In the section from Riga bypass to "Sēnīte", the speed limit outside of populated areas is 110 km/h in summer, and 90 km/h in winter. After "Sēnīte", the speed limit outside populated areas is 90 km/h all year round.

Traffic 
The A2 highway is one of the busiest highways in Latvia, reaching more than 41,000 cars per day in the section from Riga to the A1/A4 interchange. In the section until P3, the traffic intensity reaches around 29,000 cars per day. In the section until the A3 highway (Sēnīte), the highway is used by an average of 22,000 cars per day. From highway A3 to highway P8 (Sigulda), the highway is used by an average of 14,000 cars per day. Up to highway P20, the highway is used on average by at most 9,000 cars per day, and in the further section up to highway P30 (Bērzkrogs), the highway is used by an average of 3,000 cars per day, but up to the end of the highway in Latvia, no more than 4,000 cars per day. In some sections, there are even fewer than 1,000 cars per day.

There are 12 stationary speed cameras installed on the highway (including speed cameras on both driving lanes). In 2023, it is planned to start using average speed control radars in Latvia, one of which will be located on the A2 highway section 54.4 - 62.2 km.

History 
The construction of Vidzeme highway began in 1839. Farms within 20 kilometers of the work site had to assist with the construction by providing a man with a horse carriage loaded with stones. The construction of the road began in Riga and was completed in 1858, when it was added to the Saint Petersburg-Pskov-Warsaw highway network. Between certain distances, horse post stations were built, where messengers changed horses (e.g. in Bērzkrogs, Līzespasts, etc.). Initially, the road was paved with stones, the entire length of the road was asphalted only after World War II.

Before the financial crisis of 2008, it was planned to rebuild the road as a high-speed highway from Riga to "Sēnīte" (23.3 km) from 2011 to 2015, but due to a lack of funds, only the section from Berģi to Garkalne was rebuilt. In April 2019, the construction works in the section from Garkalne to "Sēnīte" started, and were completed in August 2020. The contract price of the project was 46.5 million euros, of which 60% was financed by the state budget and 40% was co-financed by the EU Cohesion Fund.

In October 2021, the reconstruction of the railway bridge in Sigulda started. As part of the construction work, a path for pedestrians and cyclists will also be built next to the road. The construction works are being carried out by SIA Viadukts for a contract price of 3.1 million euros, which is fully financed by the state budget. Construction works are expected to be completed by the end of 2022.

At the beginning of August 2022, the reconstruction of the road section "Sēnīte" - Sigulda began, which is planned to be completed in the fall of 2023. The construction works are carried out by SIA Binders, the contract price of the project is 12.3 million euros, of which 85% (10.5 million euros) is co-financed by the EU Cohesion Fund.

Crossing roads 

 A1 (E67)
 A4 (E77 & E67)
 P3
 A3 (E264)
 P10
 P8
 P32
 P20
 P31
 P30
 P29
 P27
 P23
 P44
 P39

Cities and towns crossed 
Rīga
Garkalne 
Vangaži
Gauja (town)
Sigulda
Augšlīgatne
Ieriķi
Drabeši 
Bērzkrogs
Grundzāle
Vireši 
Līzespasts

Gallery

References

External links
Autoceļš A2 in Google Maps

A02